Spartacus is a genus of true bugs belonging to the family Miridae.

The species of this genus are found in Southern America.

Species:

Spartacus albatus 
Spartacus bifasciatus 
Spartacus bolivianus 
Spartacus discovittatus 
Spartacus entrerianus 
Spartacus itatiaiensis 
Spartacus minensis 
Spartacus panamensis 
Spartacus tenuis 
Spartacus venezuelanus

References

Miridae